The Boon Brick Store is a historic building in Salem, Oregon, United States. It was built as a general store by John D. Boon who became the first Oregon State Treasurer. It also once served as Oregon's first State Treasury. It is now a brewpub owned by the McMenamins chain known as Boon's Treasury. Before being bought by McMenamins, it was known as Karr's Tavern.

The two-story Italianate-style brick structure was added to the National Register of Historic Places in 1975. John D. Boon House at Mission Mill Museum was formerly located next to the store.

A local legend states that as a teenager, President Herbert Hoover carved his initials into the outside of the building during his three-year stay with relatives in Salem. At the time the building was Lincoln Wade's grocery store.

References
 William Lincoln Wade owned the store, not Lincoln Wade.

External links
 
 Historic images of Boon Brick Store from Salem Public Library
 Historic images of Boon Brick Store from the University of Oregon digital archives

1860 establishments in Oregon
Buildings and structures in Salem, Oregon
Commercial buildings completed in 1860
Italianate architecture in Oregon
National Register of Historic Places in Salem, Oregon